Maltese cuisine reflects Maltese history; it shows strong Italian influences as well as influences from Spanish, French, Provençal, and other Mediterranean cuisines, with some later British culinary influence. Having to import most of its foodstuffs, being positioned along important trade routes, and having to cater for the resident foreign powers who ruled the islands, opened Maltese cuisine to outside influences. The traditional Maltese stewed rabbit (stuffat tal-fenek) is often identified as the national dish.

History

Malta's history and geography had an important influence on its cuisine. Having to import most of its foodstuffs, being positioned along important trade routes, and having to cater for the resident foreign powers who ruled the islands, opened Maltese cuisine to outside influences from very early on. Foreign dishes and tastes were absorbed, transformed and adapted. Italian (specifically Sicilian), Middle Eastern and Arabic foods exerted a strong influence, but the presence in Malta of the Knights of St John and, more recently, the British brought elements from further afield.

The Knights hailed from many European countries, particularly France, Italy and Spain. They brought influences from these countries. Aljotta, for example, a fish broth with plenty of garlic, herbs, and tomatoes, is the Maltese adaptation of bouillabaisse. The Knights' contacts and wealth brought also food from the New World; it has been suggested that Malta may have been one of the first countries in Europe (after Spain) where chocolate was first tasted.

The British military presence meant a market of a garrison and their families and, later, mass tourism from the UK. British food products, condiments and sauces like English mustard, Bovril, HP Sauce and Worcestershire sauce are still a subtle but pervasive presence in Maltese cooking. Other imports were only nominal. The Maltese word "aljoli" is one of the variations on aioli across the Mediterranean; the Maltese version of the sauce is based on herbs, olives, anchovies and olive oil. Similarly, while the Maltese word "taġen" is related to "tajine", in Maltese the word refers exclusively to a metal frying pan.

Cuisine and identity

There are a number of junctures in which development in Maltese cuisine related to issues of identity. The most significant example is the traditional Maltese stuffat tal-fenek (rabbit stew), often identified as the national dish, quite possibly started off as a form of symbolic resistance to the hunting restrictions imposed by the Knights of St John. The dish was to become popular after the lifting of restrictions in the late 18th century (and by which time the indigenous breed had multiplied and prices dropped) and the domestication of rabbits, a technique which could have been imported from France thanks to the French Knights.

The popularity of pork and its presence in various dishes could be attributed to Malta being on the edge of the Christian world. Consuming a food which is prohibited in the Muslim culinary culture could have been a way of self-identification by distinguishing oneself from the other. In addition to pork dishes (such as grilled pork cuts or stuffed flank) and the exclusive predominance of pork in indigenous Maltese sausages, adding some pork to dishes such as kawlata (a vegetable soup) and ross il-forn (baked rice) has been common practice in the Maltese vernacular cuisine for centuries.

For the Café Europe event held during the Austrian Presidency of the EU in 2006 the "representative" Maltese pastry chosen was the maqrut.

Variations

Regional

Despite Malta's small size there are some regional variations. This is especially the case with Gozo. This is evidenced in some names such as the Gozitan cheeselet (ġbejna t'Għawdex) and ftira Għawdxija, flatbread topped or filled with potatoes or ġbejniet with eggs, grated cheese, tomatoes, anchovies, olives, ricotta and Maltese sausage as other possible ingredients.

Other Gozitan variants include the use of ingredients. Gozitan cheeselets, for example, are used as filling for ravioli instead of the usual ricotta.

Seasonal

The strongest seasonal variations are seen in desserts and sweets. Prinjolata, kwareżimal, karamelli tal-ħarrub, ftira tar-Randan, figolla and qagħaq tal-għasel are all examples of sweets associated with a particular season.

Because Catholic fasting during Lent involved mostly meats and dairy products, fish such as Lampuki were a popular dish during this period as were stewed snails, stuffed artichokes and fritters of ġbejna, vegetables or fish (particularly whitebait and salted cod).

During the Holy Week bakers also bake a large bagel typically studded with some almonds on top called qagħqa tal-appostli (lit. apostles' bagel). Usually coinciding with the spring, there are also seasonal variations to certain dishes at the time of Lent as in, for example, adding fresh broad beans to dishes such as kusksu (a vegetable and pasta dish).

During the month of November għadam tal-mejtin (lit. bones of the dead, in ) are prepared. These are a layer of marzipan sandwiched between sweet pastry and topped with white icing (normal icing and not buttercream icing).

Qaghaq tal-Ghasel, in English, honey rings, are a traditional Maltese sweet. They consist of a pastry with a stuffing of sorts inside, made into a ring shape, with slits along the ring for the filling to dark filling to ooze out. The filling is traditionally a mixture of honey, molasses, aniseed, cinnamon and cloves, however some people add cocoa powder for a hint of chocolate. Although traditionally made for Christmas, it became so popular that people started making it all year round, and nowadays many are unaware that it was originally made for Christmas. The cake has a meaning behind it too. The fact that it is a ring means "eternal happiness" and because the filling oozes out, the phrase continues as "overflowing with goodness".

See also
List of Maltese dishes
Maltese bread
Maltese wine

References

External links
pizza.com.mt
ilovefood.com.mt

 
Mediterranean cuisine